In the study of comparative religion, the East Asian religions or Taoic religions, form a subset of the Eastern religions. This group includes Chinese religion overall, which further includes Ancestral Worship, Chinese folk religion, Confucianism, Taoism and popular salvationist organisations (such as Yiguandao and Weixinism), as well as elements drawn from Mahayana Buddhism that form the core of Chinese and East Asian Buddhism at large. The group also includes Japanese Shinto, Tenrikyo, and Korean Muism (Korean shamanism similar to Chinese Wuism), all of which combine Shamanistic elements and indigenous ancestral worship with various influences from Chinese religions. Chinese salvationist religions have influenced the rise of Japanese new religions such Tenriism and Korean Jeungsanism; as these new religious movements draw upon indigenous traditions but are heavily influenced by Chinese philosophy and theology.

All these religious traditions, more or less, share core Chinese concepts of spirituality, divinity and world order, including Tao, 道 ("Way", Pinyin dào, Japanese tō or dō, and Korean do) and Tian, 天 ("Heaven", Japanese ten, and Korean cheon''').

Early Chinese philosophies defined the Tao and advocated cultivating the de, "virtue", which arises from the knowledge of such Tao. Some ancient Chinese philosophical schools merged into traditions with different names or became extinct, such as Mohism (and many others belonging to the ancient Chinese Hundred Schools of Thought), which was largely subsumed into Taoism. East Asian religions include many theological stances, including polytheism, nontheism, henotheism, monotheism, pantheism, panentheism and agnosticism.

The place of Taoic religions among major religious groups is comparable to the Abrahamic religions found in Europe and the Western World as well as across the Middle East and the Muslim World, and Dharmic religions across the Indian subcontinent, Tibetan plateau and Southeast Asia.

Terminology
Despite a wide variety of terms, the traditions described as "Far Eastern religions", "East Asian religions" or "Chinese religions" are recognized by scholars as a distinct religious family.James, Edwin Olver. The Comparative Study of Religions of the East (excluding Christianity and Judaism). Pg 5. University of Michigan Press. 1959.

Syncretism is a common feature of East Asian religions, often making it difficult to recognise individual faiths.Fisher, Mary Pat. Living Religions: An Encyclopaedia of the World's Faiths. Pg 164. I.B. Tauris. 1997. . Further complications arise from the inconsistent use of many terms. "Tao religion" is often used for Taoism itself, as well as being used for many Tao-based new religious movements.

"Far Eastern religion" or "Taoic religion" may refer only to faiths incorporating the concept of Tao, may include Chan and Japanese Buddhism, or may inclusively refer to all Asian religions.Northrop, Filmer Stuart Cuckow. The Meeting of East and West: An Inquiry Concerning World Understanding. Pg 412. The Macmillan company. 1946.

The Tao and its virtue

The Tao may be roughly defined as the flow of reality, of the universe, or the force behind the natural order. Believed to be the influence that keeps the universe balanced and ordered, the Tao is associated with nature, due to a belief that nature demonstrates the Tao. Similar to the negative theology of Western scholars, the Tao is compared to what it is not. It is often considered to be the source of both existence and non-existence.

The Tao is often associated with a "virtue" of being, the de or te. This is considered the active expression of Tao. Generally, those religions closer to Taoism explain de as "integrity" or "wholeness", while those faiths closer to Confucianism express this concept as "morality" or "sound character".

Religions
Taoism

Taoism consists of a wide variety of religious, philosophical and ritual orders. There are hermeneutic (interpretive) difficulties in the categorisation of Taoist schools, sects and movements.

Taoism does not fall strictly under an umbrella or a definition of an organised religion like the Abrahamic traditions, nor can it purely be studied as a variant of Chinese folk religion, as much of the traditional religion is outside of the tenets and core teachings of Taoism. Robinet asserts that Taoism is better understood as a way of life than as a religion, and that its adherents do not approach or view Taoism the way non-Taoist historians have done.

In general, Taoist propriety and ethics place an emphasis on the unity of the universe, the unity of the material world and the spiritual world, the unity of the past, present and future, as well as on the Three Jewels of the Tao (love, moderation, humility). Taoist theology focuses on doctrines of wu wei ("non-action"), spontaneity, relativity and emptiness.Sharot, Stephen. A Comparative Sociology of World Religions: virtuosos, priests, and popular religion. Pg 78. New York: NYU Press, 2001. .

Traditional Chinese Taoist schools accept polytheism, but there are differences in the composition of their pantheon. On the popular level, Taoism typically presents the Jade Emperor as the head deity. Professionalised Taoism (i.e. priestly orders) usually presents Laozi and the Three Pure Ones at the top of the pantheon.

Worship of nature deities and ancestors is common in popular Taoism, while professional Taoists put an emphasis on internal alchemy. The Tao is never an object of worship, being treated more like the Indian concept of atman.

Confucianism

Confucianism is a complex system of moral, social, political, and religious thought, influential in the history of East Asia. It is commonly associated with legalism, but actually rejects legalism for ritualism. It also endorses meritocracy as the ideal of nobility. Confucianism includes a complicated system governing duties and etiquette in relationships. Confucian ethics focus on familial duty, loyalty and humaneness.

Confucianism recognises the existence of ancestral spirits and deities, advocating paying them proper respect. Confucian thought is notable as the framework upon which the syncretic Neo-Confucianism was built.

Neo-Confucianism was developed in reaction to Taoism and Chan Buddhism. It was formulated during the Song dynasty, but its roots may be traced to scholars of the Tang dynasty. It draw Buddhist religious concepts and Taoist yin yang theory, as well as the Yijing, and placed them within the framework of classic Confucianism.

Despite Neo-Confucianism's incorporation of elements of Buddhism and Taoism, its apologists still decried both faiths. Neo-Confucianism was an officially endorsed faith for over five centuries, deeply influencing all of East Asia.

New Confucianism is a modernist Confucianism, which accommodates modern science and democratic ideals, while remaining conservative in preserving traditional Neo-Confucianist positions. The influence of New Confucianism prompted since Deng Xiaoping became the leader of China in 1978 and helped cultural exchanges between China and Taiwan.

Shinto

Shinto is the ethnic religion of Japan. Shinto literally means "Way of the Gods". Shinto practitioners commonly affirm tradition, family, nature, cleanliness and ritual observation as core values.

Taoist influence is significant in their beliefs about nature and self-mastery. Ritual cleanliness is a central part of Shinto life. Shrines have a significant place in Shinto, being places for the veneration of the kami (gods or spirits). "Folk", or "popular", Shinto features an emphasis on shamanism, particularly divination, spirit possession and faith healing. "Sect" Shinto is a diverse group including mountain-worshippers and Confucian Shinto schools.

Taoism and Confucianism
The concepts of Tao and de'' are shared by both Taoism and Confucianism. The authorship of the Tao Te Ching, the central book of Taoism, is assigned to Laozi, who is traditionally held to have been a teacher of Confucius. However, some scholars believe that the Tao Te Ching arose as a reaction to Confucianism. Zhuangzi, reacting to the Confucian-Mohist ethical disputes casts Laozi as a prior step to the Mohists by name and the Confucians by implication. However, secular scholars usually consider Laozi and Zhuangzi to have been mythological figures.

Early Taoist texts reject Confucian emphasis on rituals and order, in favour of an emphasis on "wild" nature and individualism. Historical Taoists challenged conventional morality, while Confucians considered society debased and in need of strong ethical guidance.

Interaction with Dharmic religions

The entry of Buddhism into China from the Indian subcontinent was marked by interaction and syncretism with Taoism in particular. Originally seen as a kind of "foreign Taoism", Buddhism's scriptures were translated into Chinese using the Taoist vocabulary. Chan Buddhism was particularly modelled after Taoism, integrating distrust of scripture, text and even language, as well as the Taoist views of embracing "this life", dedicated practice and the "every-moment". In the Tang period Taoism incorporated such Buddhist elements as monasteries, vegetarianism, prohibition of alcohol, the doctrine of emptiness, and collecting scripture into tripartite organisation. During the same time, Chan Buddhism grew to become the largest sect in Chinese Buddhism.

The Buddha's "Dharma" seemed alien and amoral to conservative and Confucian sensibilities. Confucianism promoted social stability, order, strong families, and practical living, and Chinese officials questioned how monastic lifestyle and personal attainment of enlightenment benefited the empire. However, Buddhism and Confucianism eventually reconciled after centuries of conflict and assimilation.

Ideological and political rivals for centuries, Taoism, Confucianism, and Buddhism deeply influenced one another. They did share some similar values. All three embraced a humanist philosophy emphasising moral behavior and human perfection. In time, most Chinese people identified to some extent with all three traditions simultaneously. This became institutionalised when aspects of the three schools were synthesised in the Neo-Confucian school.

See also
 Buddhist ethics
 Edo Neo-Confucianism
 Religion in China
 Religion in Japan
 Religion in Korea
 Religion in Taiwan
 Shinbutsu-shūgō
 Three teachings

References

External links

Internet East Asian History Sourcebook: Religious Traditions
Resources for East Asian Religions 

 
Comparative religion
Religion in East Asia